Sir Lenworth George  Henry  (born 29 August 1958) is a British actor, comedian, singer, television presenter and writer.

Henry gained success as a stand-up comedian and impressionist in the late 1970s and early 1980s, culminating in The Lenny Henry Show in 1984. He was the most prominent black British comedian of the time and much of his material served to celebrate and parody his African-Caribbean roots.

In 1985, he cofounded the charity Comic Relief with the comedy screenwriter Richard Curtis. He has appeared in numerous other TV programmes, including children's entertainment show Tiswas, sitcom Chef! and The Magicians for BBC One, and in his later years has transitioned toward acting roles in stage and screen. He appears in the Amazon Prime series The Lord of the Rings: The Rings of Power.

Henry is the chancellor of Birmingham City University.

Early life
Lenworth George Henry was born at Burton Road Hospital in Dudley, on 29 August 1958, to Winston Jervis Henry (1910–1978) and Winifred Louise Henry (1922–1998), who had emigrated to Britain from Jamaica. The fifth of seven children, Henry was the first child of the family to be born in the United Kingdom. When Henry was ten years old, he began spending time with the man who was later revealed to be his biological father, Albert Augustus "Bertie" Green (1927–2004), another Jamaican immigrant with whom his mother had a brief relationship when she first arrived in England from their native Jamaica. Henry was named after the doctor who delivered him.

Henry attended St John's Primary School and later The Blue Coat School in Dudley, before completing his schooling at W.R. Tuson College in Preston, Lancashire.

Career

Early career
Henry's formative years in comedy were spent in working men's clubs, where he impersonated mainly white characters, such as the Some Mothers Do 'Ave 'Em character Frank Spencer. His earliest television appearance was on the New Faces talent show in 1975, aged 16, which he won with impersonations of Frank Spencer, Stevie Wonder and others.

His first manager was Robert Luff, who signed him in 1975 and gave him the opportunity, between the ages of 16 and 21, to perform as a comedian as part of the Luff-produced touring stage version of The Black and White Minstrel Show. In July 2009, Lenny Henry stated he was contractually obligated to perform and regretted his part in the show, telling The Times in 2015 that his appearance on the show led to a profound "wormhole of depression", and he regretted his family not intervening.

In 1976, Henry appeared with Norman Beaton in LWT's sitcom The Fosters, Britain's first comedy series featuring a predominantly black cast. Henry also made guest appearances on television programmes including Celebrity Squares, Seaside Special and The Ronnie Corbett Show.

1980s

In 1980, Henry performed in Summer Season in Blackpool with Cannon and Ball. He has since said that "the summer season was the first time [he] felt that [his] act had received a proper response from an audience". Around the same time, he co-hosted the children's programme Tiswas from 1978 until 1981 playing such characters as Rastafarian Algernon Razzmatazz, David Bellamy and Trevor McDoughnut (a parody of Trevor McDonald), and subsequently performed and wrote for the show Three of a Kind.

Also in 1980, he teamed up with alternative-comedy collective The Comic Strip. While involved with the group, he met his wife, comedian Dawn French. She encouraged him to move over to the fledgling alternative comedy scene, where he established a career as a stand-up comedy performer and character comedian.

He introduced characters who both mocked and celebrated African Caribbean British culture, such as Brixton pirate radio disc jockey DJ Delbert Wilkins. His stand-up material, which sold well on LP, owed much to the writing abilities of Kim Fuller. During this time, he also spent three years as a DJ on BBC Radio 1, playing soul and electro tracks and introducing some of the characters that he would later popularise on television. He made a guest appearance in the final episode of The Young Ones as The Postman, in 1984.

The first series of The Lenny Henry Show appeared on the BBC in 1984. The show featured stand up, spoofs like his send-up of Michael Jackson's Thriller video, and many of the characters he had developed during Summer Season, including Theophilus P. Wildebeeste (based on Teddy Pendergrass) and Delbert Wilkins. A principal scriptwriter for his television and stage shows during the 1990s was Jon Canter. The Lenny Henry Show ran periodically for a further 19 years in various incarnations. Across the incarnations, he performed impressions of several iconic American celebrities such as Beyoncé, JAY Z, Tina Turner, Prince, Michael Jackson (both men share a birthday date), Stevie Wonder, Run DMC, Cee Lo Green, Denzel Washington, Idris Elba and Wesley Snipes.

It was in 1985 that Henry co-founded the British Comic Relief charity organisation, and 1988 when the first-ever Red Nose Day was celebrated. Over 150 celebrities and comedians, including Henry, took part in an evening-long BBC broadcast, which was watched by 30 million viewers and raised over £15 million.

Prior to the 1987 general election, Henry lent his support to Red Wedge by participating in a comedy tour organised by the campaign.

In 1987, he appeared in a TV film, Coast to Coast. It was a comedy thriller with John Shea about two DJs with a shared passion for Motown music being chased across Britain. The film has a strong following, but contractual problems have prevented it from being distributed on video or DVD.

1990s
In the early 1990s, Henry starred in the Hollywood film True Identity, in which his character pretended to be a white person (using make-up, prostheses, and a wig) to avoid the mob. The film was not commercially successful. In 1991, he starred in a BBC drama alongside Robbie Coltrane called Alive and Kicking, in which he played a heroin addict, which was based on a true story.

Also in 1991, he starred in the Christmas comedy Bernard and the Genie alongside Alan Cumming and Rowan Atkinson. Henry is known as the choleric chef Gareth Blackstock from the 1990s television comedy series Chef!, or from his 1999 straight-acting lead role in the BBC drama Hope And Glory. He was co-creator with Neil Gaiman and producer of the 1996 BBC drama serial Neverwhere.

Henry appeared as a backing singer on Kate Bush's album The Red Shoes (1993) for the song "Why Should I Love You?" on which Prince played guitar. He also performed, backed by David Gilmour of Pink Floyd, at Amnesty International's Big 3-0 fund raising concert. Henry returned to the BBC to do Lenny Henry in Pieces, a character-based comedy sketch show which was followed by The Lenny Henry Show, in which he combined stand-up, character sketches and song parodies.

2000s

In 2003, Henry was listed in The Observer as one of the fifty funniest acts in British comedy. He was the voice of the British speaking clock for two weeks in March 2003 in aid of Comic Relief.

Henry voiced Dre Head, the "shrunken head" on the Knight Bus in the 2004 Alfonso Cuarón movie Harry Potter and the Prisoner of Azkaban, and read the audiobook version of Neil Gaiman's Anansi Boys. He also voiced Sporty on the children's show Little Robots. Henry appeared in advertisements for butter products in New Zealand, commissioned by the company now known as Fonterra, as well as portraying Saint Peter in the Virgin Mobile advertising campaign in South Africa. In the UK, he used his character of Theophilus P. Wildebeeste to advertise Alpen muesli, and promoted the non-alcoholic lager, Kaliber.

In June 2000, for a BBC documentary, he sailed a trimaran from Plymouth to Antigua with yachtsman Tony Bullimore.  In 2005, he appeared in Birmingham, as an act for Jasper Carrott's Rock with Laughter. He appeared alongside performers such as Bill Bailey, Jasper Carrott, Bonnie Tyler, Bobby Davro and the Lord of the Dance troupe. In 2006, Henry starred in the BBC programme Berry's Way. He did the voice of Dark Nebula in Kirby: Squeak Squad. On 16 March 2007, Henry made a cameo appearance as himself in a sketch with Catherine Tate, who appeared in the guise of her character Geordie Georgie from The Catherine Tate Show. The sketch was made for the BBC Red Nose Day fundraising programme of 2007.

On 16 June 2007 Lenny appeared with Chris Tarrant and Sally James to present a 25th Anniversary episode of Tiswas. The show lasted 90 minutes and featured celebrities discussing their enjoyment of Tiswas as children, as well as appearances from kids and people who had appeared on the original show. In the summer of 2007, he presented Lenny's Britain, a comedy documentary tour made with the Open University on BBC One on Tuesday nights. In late 2007, he hosted a stand-up comedy tour of the UK.

In early 2008, Henry's series lennyhenry.tv was broadcast on BBC One. The programme has an accompanying website of the same name and broadcasts strange, weird and generally amusing online videos and CCTV clips. He starred in the Radio 4 show Rudy's Rare Records. On 31 December 2008 and 1 January 2009, he appeared on Jools Holland's Hootenanny on BBC Two, singing part of the song Mercy along with singer Duffy. In January 2009, he appeared on the BBC's comedy show, Live at The Apollo, in which he played host for the night, introducing Andy Parsons and Ed Byrne, where he referred to Wikipedia as "Wrongopedia" for containing incorrect information about his life.

In October 2009, Henry reprised his role of Deakus to feature in comedy shorts about story writing alongside Nina Wadia, Tara Palmer Tomkinson and Stephen K. Amos. He also offers his own writing tips and amusing anecdotes in the writing tips video clip on BBC raw words – story writing. He supplied the voices of both Big and Small in the BBC CBeebies children's programme Big & Small.

2010s

In 2010, Henry produced and starred in a five-part web series for the BBC Comedy website, Conversations with my Wife, about a fictional couple conversing over Skype while the wife is away on business leaving the husband (played by Henry) to hold the fort at home.

In 2008, he became the face of budget hotel operator Premier Inn. One of the 2010 adverts caused controversy and was banned from children's programming hours as it parodied a well-known scene from the film The Shining, with Lenny Henry spoofing the scene originally starring Jack Nicholson, smashing a door with an axe and then thrusting his head through the door saying: "Here's Lenny."

In 2011, Henry presented a Saturday night magic series called The Magicians on BBC One. The show returned in 2012; however, Henry was replaced by Darren McMullen.

In March 2011, he appeared with Angela Rippon, Samantha Womack and Reggie Yates in the BBC fundraising documentary for Comic Relief called Famous, Rich and in the Slums, wherein the four celebrities were sent to Kibera in Kenya, the African continent's largest slum.

Henry was criticised for his opening sketch for the 2011 Comic Relief, during which he spoofed the film The King's Speech and grew impatient with Colin Firth's portrayal of King George VI as he stammered over his speech. The Sun reported that the British Stammering Association had branded the sketch as "a gross and disgusting gleefulness at pointing out someone else's misfortune".

In 2014, Henry appeared in and produced a play based on his radio show Rudy's Rare Records, which played at the Birmingham Repertory Theatre before moving on to a run in London.

Henry wrote Danny and the Human Zoo, a ninety-minute television film shown on BBC One in 2015. Directed by Destiny Ekaragha, it was a fictionalised account of Henry's life as a teenager in 1970s Dudley. Henry played Samson Fearon, a character based on Henry's own father Winston.

In 2017, Henry appeared in a recurring role in the third series of Broadchurch.

In November 2019, it was announced that Henry would guest star in "Spyfall", the two-part opening episode of Doctor Whos twelfth revived series, which broadcast on New Year's Day and 4 January 2020. Henry played technology billionaire Daniel Barton.

2020s
In December 2020, Henry was announced as a cast member of Amazon Prime Video's The Lord of the Rings: The Rings of Power. It premiered on 1 September 2022.

In 2021, Henry appeared as a contestant on the second series of The Masked Singer, masked as "The Blob". He finished in 6th place.

On 6 November 2021, The Guardian published Black British culture matters, curated by Henry and Marcus Ryder for its Saturday Culture Issue No7.

In 2022, Henry was cast in The Sandman as the voice of Martin Tenbones, a magical, doglike creature who appears in the dreams of another character called Barbie.

COVID-19 vaccination
In March 2021, Henry wrote an open letter urging everyone to get a COVID-19 vaccination. Henry stated people ought to, "trust the facts" and distrust misinformation. Henry also wrote, "Because we love you – we want you to be safe and we don’t want you to be left out or left behind. While other communities are rushing to get the vaccine and millions have already been vaccinated, some Black people in our community are being more cautious,"  The letter encourages black UK adults to take an informed decision over the vaccine and get vaccinated so as to protect themselves and those they care for.

Shakespeare
Henry was introduced to the works of Shakespeare when he made the 2006 Radio 4 series Lenny and Will, which saw him going "in search of the magic of Shakespeare in performance". In February 2009, he appeared in the title role in the Northern Broadsides production of Othello at the West Yorkshire Playhouse in Leeds. Before the production opened the director Barrie Rutter said of the decision to cast him: "knives might be out at me or at Lenny. I don't care. This has come about from a completely genuine desire to do a piece of theatrical work. Bloody hell, how long has the Donmar had Hollywood stars going there for £200? He's six-foot five. He's beautifully black. And he's Othello."

Henry received widespread critical acclaim in the role. Charles Spencer in The Daily Telegraph said "This is one of the most astonishing debuts in Shakespeare I have ever seen. It is impossible to praise too highly Henry's courage in taking on so demanding and exposed a role, and then performing it with such authority and feeling." Michael Billington in The Guardian noted "Henry's voice may not always measure up to the rhetorical music of the verse, but there is a simple dignity to his performance that touches one". Lynne Walker of The Independent said of Henry that his "emotional dynamism is in no doubt. The frenzy within his imagination explodes into rage and, finally, wretchedness. It's not a subtle reading but it works powerfully in this context."

Henry has said that he saw parallels between himself and Othello. "I'm used to being the only black person wherever I go...There was never a black or Asian director when I went to the BBC. Eventually I thought 'where are they all?' I spent a lot of time on my own. Things have changed a bit, but rarely at the BBC do I meet anyone of colour in a position of power."

The production was scheduled to transfer to the West End of London from 11 September to 12 December 2009, to be performed at the Trafalgar Studios in Whitehall.

In November 2011, Henry made his debut at the Royal National Theatre in London in Shakespeare's The Comedy of Errors, directed by Dominic Cooke, in which he played the character of Antipholus of Syracuse. The production was selected to be broadcast live to selected cinemas worldwide in March 2012 as part of the National Theatre Live programme. Henry's performance gained positive reviews. Paul Taylor in The Independent wrote that "Henry beautifully conveys the tragicomic plight of an innocent abroad."

Music career
In 2015, Henry was asked by Sky Arts to produce a show for them, Lenny Henry's Got The Blues. He worked with a group of musicians including Jakko Jakszyk, lead singer of King Crimson, to produce the album New Millennium Blues. The album consists of both covers of blues classics, as well as original tracks co-written by Lenny. Henry later released "hard-hitting animated blues video" directed by Iranian filmmaker, Sam Chegini titled The Cops Don't Know which was premiered by Classic Rock magazine on 20 April 2016.

Writing career
Henry has published four books, two autobiographies, and two young adult fantasies.

Who Am I, Again? (2019) a memoir that covered his formative years, starting with the arrival of his parents in Dudley, and ending when he began to experience success in the late 1970s.

Rising to the Surface continues his memoirs from the point his first ended. Rising... covers his rise to fame. Henry begins with his children’s show Tiswas and continues through his The Lenny Henry Show, which was broadcast for 20 years though not continuously.

Henry's two young adult books were written to address his belief that the lack of non-white characters in fantasy was harmful to young adult non-white readers. The Boy With Wings tells the story of a boy who sprouts wings and learns to fly. He and his friends must save the world. The Book of Legends features two black siblings Bran and Fran who live with their mother in a small Midlands town. When their mother goes missing, their hunt for her leads them to another world.

Personal life
Henry met Dawn French on the alternative comedy circuit. They married on 20 October 1984 in Covent Garden, London and have one child, an adopted daughter named Billie. On 6 April 2010, French and Henry announced they were "amicably" separating after 25 years of marriage. Their divorce was finalised in 2010.

Henry obtained a BA Hons degree in English Literature from the Open University in 2007 and an MA in Screenwriting for TV and Film from Royal Holloway, University of London in 2010. He subsequently studied at the latter institution for a Doctor of Philosophy (PhD) degree on the role of black people in the media. In July 2018, Henry was awarded a PhD in media arts for a thesis titled Does the Coach Have to be Black? The Sports Film, Screenwriting and Diversity: A Practice-Based Enquiry.

Henry has been an open critic of British television's lack of ethnic diversity in its programmes. During a speech at the British Academy of Film and Television Arts in March 2014, he called the lack of minorities "appalling" and he has continued to raise the issue publicly.

Henry is a lifelong supporter of West Bromwich Albion Football Club.

Honours

Henry was appointed a Commander of the Order of the British Empire (CBE) in the 1999 New Year Honours. He received the Lifetime Achievement Award at the British Comedy Awards in 2003. He was knighted in the Queen's 2015 Birthday Honours for services to drama and charity. In July 2016, Henry became the chancellor of Birmingham City University citing his passion to give life changing opportunities to young people from a wide range of backgrounds. Henry has also been listed in the Powerlist of the 100 most influential Black Britons, including ranking fourth in 2016.

In 2016, Henry was made a fellow of the Royal Television Society. Henry was awarded the BAFTA Television: Special Award, the Alan Clarke Award for Outstanding Contribution to TV, in 2016. Also in 2016, Henry was awarded an honorary doctorate from Nottingham Trent University in recognition of his significant contribution to British comedy and drama, along with his achievements in international charity work.

Bibliography
  Henry, Lenny. Who Am I, Again?, Faber & Faber, 2019;  288 pages.
  Henry, Lenny. Access All Areas, Faber & Faber, 2021;  192 pages.
  Henry, Lenny. Rising to the Surface, Faber & Faber, 2021;  336 pages.
  Henry, Lenny. The Boy with Wings, Macmillan Children's Books, 2021;  224 pages.
  Henry, Lenny. The Book of Legends, Macmillan Children's Books, 2022;  272 pages.

Narration
 White Teeth by Zadie Smith (audiobook) 2000.
 Anansi Boys by Neil Gaiman (audiobook) 2005.
 My Name Is Leon by Kit de Waal (audiobook) 2016.
 Who Am I, Again? by Lenny Henry (audiobook) 2019.

Filmography
Film

TelevisionStageReferences

Sources
  Margolis, Jonathan. Lenny Henry – A Biography, Orion, 1995;  196 pages.

External links

 Comedian Henry tackles Othello BBC News
 Lenny Henry at the BFI's Screenonline
 Lenny Henry at the British Film Institute
 Lenny Henry at the MBC's Encyclopedia of Television
 Lenny Henry at the Bbc.co.uk Guide to Comedy
 
 Learn how to write stories with Lenny Henry. BBC raw wordsArticles'
 "Not enough black people in top media jobs, says Henry" The Guardian
 Messenger News interview, May 2008
 Thedrum.com article

1958 births
Living people
20th-century English comedians
20th-century English male actors
21st-century English comedians
21st-century English male actors
Actors awarded knighthoods
Alumni of the Open University
Alumni of Royal Holloway, University of London
Audiobook narrators
BBC Radio 1 presenters
Black British male comedians
Black British writers
Black British male actors
Black British television personalities
Blackface minstrel performers
British male Shakespearean actors
Chrysalis Records artists
Comedians from Worcestershire
Comic Relief
Comic Relief people
Commanders of the Order of the British Empire
English autobiographers
English impressionists (entertainers)
English male film actors
English male television actors
English male voice actors
English people of Jamaican descent
English stand-up comedians
English television producers
Fellows of the Royal Television Society
Knights Bachelor
Male actors from the West Midlands (county)
Male actors from Worcestershire
People associated with Birmingham City University
People educated at St James Academy, Dudley
People from Dudley
People from Shinfield